Stanton is a town in Haywood County, Tennessee. The population was 615 as of the 2000 census and 452 at the 2010 census, showing a population decrease of 163.

Geography
Stanton is located at  (35.462463, -89.401253).

Demographics

As of the census of 2000, there were 615 people, 254 households, and 167 families residing in the town. The population density was 1,191.3 people per square mile (456.6/km2). There were 283 housing units at an average density of 548.2 per square mile (210.1/km2). The racial makeup of the town was 67.80% African American, 31.00% whites 0.16% Native American and 0.16% Pacific Islander. Hispanic or Latino of any race were 0.49% of the population.

There were 254 households, out of which 39.4% had children under the age of 18 living with them, 26.8% were married couples living together, 35.8% had a female householder with no husband present, and 33.9% were non-families. 30.3% of all households were made up of individuals, and 10.6% had someone living alone who was 65 years of age or older. The average household size was 2.42 and the average family size was 2.98.

In the town, the population was spread out, with 32.5% under the age of 18, 9.8% from 18 to 24, 27.5% from 25 to 44, 18.2% from 45 to 64, and 12.0% who were 65 years of age or older. The median age was 30 years. For every 100 females, there were 80.4 males. For every 100 females age 18 and over, there were 60.9 males.

The median income for a household in the town was $17,422, and the median income for a family was $18,229. Males had a median income of $30,000 versus $19,583 for females. The per capita income for the town was $13,888. About 36.5% of families and 40.9% of the population were below the poverty line, including 51.4% of those under age 18 and 36.8% of those age 65 or over.

Joseph Boyd Rives (1888-1965) lived here before moving to Rossville, Tennessee.  There he started Rossville Bank.  This was purchased by Somerville Bank and Trust.  Later Somerville Bank and Trust was purchased by Trustmark National Bank.

Economy
A  tract in southwestern Haywood County near Stanton has been designated for a state-supported industrial "megasite," intended for a large-scale industrial or business development such as an automobile assembly plant. In September 2009, Tennessee's State Building Commission authorized spending of $40 million for purchase of the land.

On September 27, 2021, it was announced that Ford and SK Innovation would construct a complex at the megasite called "Blue Oval City" to manufacture electric vehicles and batteries. The facility, which is expected to be operational in 2025, will cost approximately $5.6 billion, making it the most expensive single investment in state history, and employ approximately 5,700.

References

Further reading
 

Towns in Haywood County, Tennessee
Towns in Tennessee
Majority-minority cities and towns in Tennessee